Porto Santo Airport  is an airport located in Vila Baleira, the capital of Porto Santo Island, Madeira. 

The military Maneuver Aerodrome n.° 3 (Aeródromo de Manobra n.º 3) or AM3 is co-located within the limits of civilian Porto Santo Airport.

History
The island of Porto Santo was the first of the Madeira Islands to obtain an airport. The first aircraft to land at this airport was a TAP Air Portugal Douglas DC-4, on 20 July 1960.

The airport's infrastructure has improved over time, with increases to the runway length and in ramp surface. The last improvements to the airport structure were finalized on 28 August 1995, with the inauguration of a new passenger terminal and a new increase in runway length, which then reached . The runway was also re-paved.

Management
Porto Santo Airport is managed by ANA Aeroportos de Portugal.

Facilities
The airport has a  asphalt/concrete runway, with no ILS equipment as of 2011, but with VOR and NDB approaches available.

Military air base
The Maneuver Aerodrome no 3 (AM3) is a Portuguese Air Force forward air base which shares its aeronautical facilities with the Porto Santo Airport. The AM3 was created in 2009 by the transformation of the previous Madeira Air Detachment. It does not have permanently based flying squadrons, but supports permanent detachments of the Squadron 502 (EADS CASA C-295 aircraft) and Squadron 751 (AgustaWestland EH101 helicopters), which focus in search and rescue missions.

Airlines and destinations
The following airlines operate regular scheduled and charter flights at Porto Santo Airport:

Statistics

See also
List of airports in Portugal

References

External links
 Official website

Airports in Portugal
Airport
Buildings and structures in Madeira
Transport in Madeira